Jason Howard Winrow (January 16, 1971 – September 23, 2012) was an American football offensive guard. He played college football at Ohio State from 1989 to 1993. Winrow was a sixth round draft pick by the New York Giants in 1994.

After several seasons on NFL teams' practice squads, Winrow returned to Westerville, Ohio, and went into private business. He died on September 23, 2012, in his home.

References

1971 births
2012 deaths
Sportspeople from Cumberland County, New Jersey
American football offensive guards
Ohio State Buckeyes football players
New York Giants players
People from Bridgeton, New Jersey
People from Westerville, Ohio
Players of American football from New Jersey